Honeoye Falls is a village within the town of Mendon in Monroe County, New York, United States. The population was 2,706 at the 2020 census. The village includes a small waterfall on Honeoye Creek, which flows through the village and gives it its name. The name Honeoye comes from the Seneca word ha-ne-a-yah, which means lying finger, or where the finger lies. The name comes from the local story of a Native American whose finger was bitten by a rattlesnake and who therefore cut off his finger with a tomahawk.

History
The village was founded in 1791 by Zebulon Norton when he purchased  of land for the price of 12½ cents per acre. He built a grist mill and later a saw mill, at a waterfall on Honeoye Creek. The area was originally known as Norton Mills. In 1827, Hiram Finch built a second mill, which would come to be called the Lower Mill to differentiate it from the earlier mill. On May 17, 1973, the Lower Mill was listed on the National Register of Historic Places. The Honeoye Falls Village Historic District, St. John's Episcopal Church, Totiakton Site, and United States Post Office are also listed on the National Register of Historic Places.

Honeoye Falls experienced an epidemic of scarlet fever in April 1893.

Geography
The village is located on the falls of Honeoye Creek. It is the primary outlet of Honeoye Lake.

Honeoye Falls is located at  (42.956331, −77.587353). The village is in the most southeastern corner of Monroe County, approximately 13 miles outside of the City of Rochester.

Demographics

As of the census of 2020, there were 2,706 people, 1,195 households, and 689 families residing in the village. 

As of the census of 2000, there were 2,595 people, 1,114 households, and 672 families residing in the village. The population density was 1,000.3 inhabitants per square mile (386.8/km2). There were 1,156 housing units, with an average density of 445.6 per square mile (172.3/km2). The racial makeup of the village was 97.15% White, 1.00% African American, 0.15% Native American, 0.77% Asian, 0.00% Pacific Islander, 0.23% from other races, and 0.69% from two or more races. 1.04% of the population were Hispanic or Latino of any race.

Out of 1,114 households, 30.2% had children under the age of 18 living with them, 46.7% were married couples living together, 11.1% had a female householder with no husband present, and 39.6% were non-families. 34.8% of all households were made up of individuals, and 18.0% had someone living alone who was 65 years of age or older. The average household size was 2.26 and the average family size was 2.95.

In the village, the population was spread out, with 24.2% under the age of 18, 5.6% from 18 to 24, 26.4% from 25 to 44, 25.2% from 45 to 64, and 18.5% who were 65 years of age or older. The median age was 41 years. For every 100 females, there were 80.3 males. For every 100 females age 18 and over, there were 74.2 males.

The median income for a household in the village was $47,413 and the median income for a family was $66,818. Males had a median income of $46,136 versus $35,299 for females. The per capita income for the village was $27,987. 2.5% of the population and 0.6% of families were below the poverty line. 2.3% of those under the age of 18 and 4.6% of those 65 and older were living below the poverty line.

Quick summary:
Males (44.5%), Females (55.5%)
White (96.5%), Hispanic (1%), Black (1%), Two or more races (.7%)
Median resident age – 41.2 years old
Median household income in 2000 – $47,413
Median house value in 2000 – $123,500

Government

The village is governed by a board consisting of a mayor and four trustees, all elected by registered village voters.

The Board of Trustees are:
Mayor Richard B. Milne, Trustee Jacquelin Main, Trustee Shari Stottler, Trustee Daniel Harris, and Deputy Mayor Stanley E. Worboys Jr.

Justice Sheldon Boyce presides over the Village Court.

Education
Public schools in Honeoye Falls are part of the Honeoye Falls-Lima Central School District. Schools within the village include Honeoye Falls-Lima Senior High School, Honeoye Falls-Lima Middle School, and Manor Intermediate School. The Lima Primary School is in the district but located in the Town of Lima. The School mascot is the Cougar.

93.2% of the population 25 years and older hold a high school diploma or higher, 43.5% a bachelor's degree or higher, and 16.4% a graduate/professional degree.

Notable people
David Francis Barry, 19th century photographer of the American West
Truddi Chase, author of "When Rabbit Howls"
Charles A. Goheen, Medal of Honor recipient for the American Civil War
Marty Reasoner, hockey player

Events
Festival on the Green – Popular music and art event for local talent.

Rotary
There is also an active Rotary group that meets every Wednesday at a local restaurant to discuss and raise money for many charitable causes.

References

External links
Village of Honeoye Falls, NY webpage
Lehigh Valley railroad Station, Honeoye Falls, NY.

Villages in New York (state)
Populated places established in 1791
Rochester metropolitan area, New York
Villages in Monroe County, New York
1791 establishments in New York (state)